Ollheim is a farming village in the municipality Swisttal in the North Rhine-Westphalian Rhein-Sieg district. It is situated approximately 19 km west of Bonn. In 2007 it had 723 inhabitants.

References

External links 
 Website of Ollheim (German)
 Website of the municipality Swisttal (German)

Towns in North Rhine-Westphalia